Akhmed Arslanaliyovych Alibekov (born 29 May 1998) is a Ukrainian professional footballer who plays as a defensive midfielder for Lviv.

Career
Born in Zaporizhzhia, Alibekov is a product of the Metalurh Zaporizhya youth sportive school.

He played for FC Metalurh and FC Dynamo in the Ukrainian Premier League Reserves and in October 2017 he was promoted to the senior squad team. Alibekov made his debut in the Ukrainian Premier League for Dynamo Kyiv on 18 March 2018, playing in a winning match against FC Vorskla Poltava.

On 24 September 2020, he joined Russian Premier League club FC Ufa on loan.

In January 2023 he moved to Lviv.

References

External links 

1998 births
Living people
Footballers from Zaporizhzhia
Ukrainian footballers
Ukrainian expatriate footballers
FC Dynamo Kyiv players
Ukrainian Premier League players
FC Slovan Liberec players
FC Ufa players
FC Zorya Luhansk players
FC Lviv players
Russian Premier League players
Expatriate footballers in the Czech Republic
Ukrainian expatriate sportspeople in the Czech Republic
Expatriate footballers in Russia
Ukrainian expatriate sportspeople in Russia
Association football defenders
Ukraine youth international footballers
Ukraine under-21 international footballers